Cycling Federation of Bosnia & Herzegovina (BSBiH) is the main national governing body for cycle sport in BiH. BSBiH is a member of the Union Cycliste Internationale (UCI) and Union Européenne de Cyclisme (UET).  
Founded in 1949, it is one of the oldest athletic organizations in BiH.

See also 

 Culture of BiH
 Balkan Elite Road Classics

References 

Cycle racing organizations
Cycling
Sports organizations established in 1949
1949 establishments in Yugoslavia